The 2012–13 FK-League was the fourth season of the FK-League. The season began on 24 November 2012, and ended on 23 March 2013.

Teams
 Daegu Osung FC
 Seoul Gwangjin FC
 Seoul Eunpyong Ninety Plus
 FS Seoul
 Yes Gumi FC
 Yongin FS
 Jeonju MAG FC
 Jecheon FS
 Fantasia Bucheon FS

League table

Playoff

Semi-Playoff

Playoff

Championship Match
Leg 1

Leg 2

Champions

References

FK-League
2012 in futsal
2013 in futsal